The cooper test which was designed by Kenneth H. Cooper in 1968 for US military use is a physical fitness test. In its original form, the point of the test is to run as far as possible within 12 minutes. Pacing is important, as the participant will not cover a maximal distance if they begin with a pace too close to an all out sprint. The outcome is based on the distance the test person ran, their age and their sex. 

It is an easy test to perform in larger groups. For athletes, the length of the run is considered to be that of a long distance run, since everything above 3 km is rated "long distance"—which means the runner will primarily use their "red", slow oxidative muscle cells.

For comparison the 2 miles (3,218.7 meters) outdoor world record is 7:58.61 by Daniel Komen, the 5000 meters world record outdoor of Joshua Cheptegei is 12:35.36. The 2 miles outdoor world record for women is Meseret Defar with 8:58.58 and Tirunesh Dibaba time for the outdoor 5000 m is 14:11.15.

Interpretation of results
The following is an example of the many tables that exist for the test:

VO2 max estimate 

The results can be correlated with VO2 max.

Formula:

where d12 is distance (in metres) covered in 12 minutes, alternatively

where d(miles)12 is distance (in miles) covered in 12 minutes.

Practical use 
For practical use, precise monitoring presents a challenge. Not all military bases have a running track, and tracking soldiers' laps and positions after 12 minutes is difficult. Testing is easier to administer when the distance is fixed and the finishing time measured. In his original book, Cooper also provided an alternate version of the test, based on the time to complete a 1.5 mile run.

Most armies and police agencies of the world use a fixed distance. This is not exactly a Cooper test but a reasonable practical compromise as long as the distance is of sufficient length to put a continuous load on the cardiovascular system for 10 or more minutes. For example, the British Army uses 1.5 miles, the Australian Army uses 2.4 kilometers, the US Army uses 2 miles and the US Marine Corps 3 miles. For each base the course is measured and local corrections (elevation, conditions, etc.) applied. Soldiers are sent off in waves, and timed over the finish line by some PTIs with a stopwatch.

For personal trainers, the Cooper Test, when carried out on a treadmill, is a reliable and repeatable method for measuring a client's progress.

As a standard test this test should to be performed only under standard conditions:

 Between 50 and 75 °F (10 to 25 °C) with 75% maximum humidity.
 On a standard 400 m Tartan track or similar.
 The candidate should not suffer from respiratory problems.

The test is not considered to be useful for untrained pupils at all.

Football referees 
The Cooper test was one of the most commonly used fitness tests to measure the fitness levels of both amateur and professional football referees, including referees from the FA (English Football Association). More recently, many countries have decided to stop relying on the Cooper Test, claiming that the Cooper test does not correlate well to a real football match, where players run short sprints rather than at a regular pace. Thus it may not truly indicate if a referee will be able to perform well in a football match. All FIFA referees are now required to pass the HI Intensity Fitness Test. National associations are gradually requiring some of their top-tier officials to do the HI Intensity Fitness Test also. Lower level referees are often given a choice to either perform the HI Intensity Fitness Test or the Cooper Test. Nevertheless, the recent trend seems to indicate that the Cooper Test is slowly being phased out.

See also
Training effect

References 

Aerobic exercise
Fitness tests
Running
Sports terminology